Melvin Ayikoe Fares Sitti (born 14 February 2000) is a French professional footballer who plays as a midfielder for the French club Guingamp II.

Early life
Sitti was born in Paris and is of Togolese descent.

Career
A youth product of Paris FC, Sitti joined Sochaux in 2017. He made his professional debut for the club in a 0–0 Ligue 2 tie with Caen on 26 July 2019.

On 28 January 2020, Sitti signed for Premier League club Norwich City on a four-and-a-half-year contract before being loaned back to Sochaux for the rest of the season. On 30 August 2021, his contract with Norwich was terminated by mutual consent.

On 1 January 2022, Sitti signed with Championnat National side Annecy. On 15 September 2022, he transferred to the reserves of Guingamp.

References

External links
Profile at the Norwich City F.C. website

2000 births
Living people
Footballers from Paris
French footballers
French sportspeople of Togolese descent
Association football midfielders
Paris FC players
FC Sochaux-Montbéliard players
Norwich City F.C. players
S.K. Beveren players
FC Annecy players
En Avant Guingamp players
Ligue 2 players
Championnat National 2 players
Championnat National 3 players
French expatriate footballers
Expatriate footballers in England
Expatriate footballers in Belgium
French expatriate sportspeople in England
French expatriate sportspeople in Belgium